Hazardia brickellioides is a species of shrub in the family Asteraceae known by the common name brickellbush goldenweed. It is native to the Mojave Desert of California and Nevada, where it grows in rocky limestone habitat.

The plant produces several flower heads each roughly a centimeter (0.4 inches) wide when open. The flower head is lined with roughly hairy, glandular phyllaries and contains disc florets surrounded with a fringe of tiny yellow ray florets. The fruit is a hairy white achene topped with a pappus of many white or brown bristles.

References

External links
Jepson Manual Treatment

brickellioides
Flora of California
Plants described in 1922
Flora of Nevada
Flora without expected TNC conservation status